Ambassador Odette Melono of Cameroon became Deputy Director-General of the Organisation for the Prohibition of Chemical Weapons (OPCW) on January 14, 2019. Melono also served as Ambassador of Cameroon to the Netherlands and Luxembourg and the Permanent Representative of Cameroon to the OPCW, from 2008 to 2018.

Melono was the first full Cameroonian Ambassador to serve in the Netherlands. Melono graduated from the University of Paris X with a Bachelor's and a master's degree in Law before going on to earn a master's degree in Corporate Tax Management from the University of Paris-Dauphine and a master's degree as well as a Doctorate in International Relations from the University of Yaoundé II.

References

Living people
Year of birth missing (living people)
Organisation for the Prohibition of Chemical Weapons
Women ambassadors
Ambassadors of Cameroon to Luxembourg
Ambassadors of Cameroon to the Netherlands
University of Paris alumni